Sweet Tooth is the fourth Halloween CD released by Mannheim Steamroller, following Halloween (2-disc set, one is Music, the other EFX), Monster Mix (one disc, music & efx mix), and Halloween 2: Creatures Collection (3-disc set; one is music, one is EFX & Dance Remixes, the last is DVD videos).  Sweet Tooth is a one-disc release featuring 13 tracks produced between 2003 and 2006, collected and released in 2006.

This hard-to-find CD is not available on their website, only in specialty stores.

Track listing
Composted by Chip Davis.
 "Enchanted Forest" (EFX) – 0:42
 "Rock & Roll Graveyard" – 3:51
 "Go to the Light" (EFX) – 5:26
 "The Sorcerer's Apprentice" – 4:50
 "Ghost Voices" (EFX) – 4:42
 "Trick or Treat" – 4:53
 "Devil's Oath" (EFX) – 6:11
 "All Hallow's Eve" – 3:42
 "Space-Men" (Creatures Lift Off Mix) – 4:39
 "Harvest Dance" – 3:01
 "Hall of the Mountain King" – 2:51
 "Purgatory's Pond" (EFX) – 6:02
 "Creatures of the Night" – 3:40

2007 albums
Mannheim Steamroller albums
Halloween albums
American Gramaphone albums